Ballophilus latisternus is a species of centipede in the genus Ballophilus. It is found in Madagascar. The original description of this species is based on a male holotype measuring 20 mm in length with 47 pairs of legs.

References 

Ballophilidae
Arthropods of Madagascar